Pedicellinidae is a family of Entoprocta belonging to the order Solitaria.

Genera:
 Brachionis  Pallas, 1774
 Crinomorpha  van Beneden, 1844
 Loxosomatoides  Annandale, 1908
 Myosoma  Robertson, 1900
 Pedicellina  Sars, 1835
 Sangavella  Marcus, 1957

References

Entoprocta